A da'i is generally someone who engages in Dawah, the act of inviting people to Islam.

See also 
 Dawah
 Da'i al-Mutlaq,  "the absolute (unrestricted) missionary" (Arabic: الداعي المطلق)
 Hujja
 List of da'is

References

Arabic words and phrases
 
Islamic terminology
Religious titles